The Mayleeno is a historic apartment building located immediately behind the Athenæum (Das Deutsche Haus) at Indianapolis, Indiana.  It was built in 1914, and is a three-story, "U"-shaped, brick and limestone building reminiscent of the Arts and Crafts movement.  It features screened balcony porches on the front of each apartment unit.

It was listed on the National Register of Historic Places in 1983.

References

Apartment buildings in Indiana
Residential buildings on the National Register of Historic Places in Indiana
Residential buildings completed in 1914
Residential buildings in Indianapolis
National Register of Historic Places in Indianapolis